Higher Education for the Future is a peer-reviewed multi-disciplinary journal that focuses on a wide spectrum of issues in the area of higher education.

The journal is published twice a year by SAGE Publications, India, in association with the Kerala State Higher Education Council, and is abstracted and indexed on J-Gate. It is a member of the Committee on Publication Ethics (COPE).

References 

 COPE
 http://www.kshec.kerala.gov.in/index.php?option=com_content&view=article&id=105&Itemid=79

External links 
 
 Homepage

SAGE Publishing academic journals
Publications established in 2014
Education journals
Higher education